Cory Pesaturo is an American musician from Cumberland, Rhode Island. Pesaturo is an accordion player, who also plays the piano, clarinet, and saxophone. He began playing at the age of nine, and in 2002, became the youngest person to win the National Accordion Championship. In 2009, he won the Coupe Mondiale World Digital Accordion Championship in Auckland, New Zealand, and became the first American to win a World Accordion Championship since Peter Soave 25 years earlier. In 2011, Pesaturo who had previously stopped playing acoustic accordion, won the Primus Ikaalinen World Acoustic Accordion Championship, while additionally being its first ever American contestant. Furthermore on the world titles, Pesaturo used his own arrangements for the band, improvised most of the performances, and played on borrowed accordions; all of which were unheard of in world accordion championships. In 2017, he broke the Guinness World Record for the longest continuous playing of the accordion, which was sponsored by Red Bull from his relationship with the Red Bull F1 Team.  In 2009, Cory won the Leavenworth International Championship, and International Jazz Championship, along with performing in 5 different continents which included the countries of Canada, Italy, New Zealand, Tunisia and Japan.  Pesaturo is one of only four accordionists in history to win a World Championship on both acoustic and electronic accordion, and is the only person to also win a world championship in jazz.

Life and career

Pesaturo got his start filling in for an ill Myron Floren at the former Warwick Music Theater in Rhode Island at age 11.  Starting at the age of 12, he performed at the White House on four occasions, including at six other public and private functions for President Bill Clinton and Hillary Clinton. In June 1999, he performed at a State Dinner held for the President of Hungary becoming the youngest person to perform for a State Dinner.

He was accepted on the accordion at the New England Conservatory of Music in Boston, MA where he studied Contemporary Improvisation and a variety of music styles.  Pesaturo became the second person to major in and graduate as an accordionist at the New England Conservatory. In 2008, Roland named Pesaturo as part of their team of four American accordionists which will promote Roland's V-Accordion. Pesaturo performed for Roland at the Music Trade show NAMM in 2009 and was featured with Eddie Montiero in a Concert for international press and NAMM dignitaries. He has also performed with different symphony orchestras around the country, including soloing the Brockton Symphony Orchestra at 15.

Today he performs genres ranging from Italian music festivals across the United States, playing mainstream music with DJ's, folk genres from French to Bulgarian and Jewish music, Classical music performances with the Boston Symphony Orchestra, and Jazz which is he most known for.

His music has been played for various Formula 1 races on SPEED TV and now NBC Sports starting in 2007, on the Velocity program "Chasing Classic Cars", and also at various Concours around the United States such as the Pebble Beach Concours d'Elegance.  Pesaturo has also combined his interest in statistics and sports with his collaborations on 98.5 The Sports Hub, and his appearance on the "100 Year Anniversary of Fenway Park" album in 2012, with current and past Boston Red Sox players, and journalists. Cory's interest in weather prompted him to write the 2005 Atlantic Hurricane Season records list, later seasons of note, and other meteorological topics.  Pesaturo was a featured contestant on CBS's Let's Make a Deal in 2021, performer on NBC's That's My Jam with Jimmy Fallon in 2022, and was chosen to be the featured accordionist on "Weird Al" Yankovic's biographical movie Weird: The Al Yankovic Story.  Additionally, he has given 4 TEDx Talks, and a host of other talks at known conferences, including 2 Talks at Google.

Discography

Albums 

Zulu Time (2011)             
Change in the Weather (2007)
Crosswinds (2007)

Collaborative albums 
The Outrospectives LIVE! (2020)  
Unscripted with Mari Black (2020)  
The Outrospectives: Dancing Light (2019)  
100 Year Anniversary of Fenway Park (2012)    
Tiny Orchestra (2008)
A Pennywhistle Christmas (2004)

Soundtracks 
 Weird: The Al Yankovic Story (2022)

Conferences / Talks

TED Talks 
 Revolutionizing the Accordion  
 Winning Like the Red Sox  
 World Collaboration Song for the COVID-19 Pandemic  
 The Mind of a Musician

Talks at Google 
 Accordion to Cory

References

External links
 Cory Pesaturo
 Roland Music Artists  
 Cory Pesaturo on the 2009-2010 Winter
 2007 Hurricane Records List
 Guinness World Record Data

American accordionists
Living people
21st-century accordionists
Year of birth missing (living people)
21st-century American musicians
21st-century American male musicians
20th-century accordionists
20th-century American musicians
20th-century American male musicians
People from Cumberland, Rhode Island
Musicians from Rhode Island
New England Conservatory alumni